Other Worlds: Notions of Self and Emotion among the Lohorung Rai is a 2000 non-fiction social sciences book by Charlotte Hardman. The book was published on December 1, 2000 through Berg Publishers and is about the rites and ritual of the Lohorung people of Nepal use to be to connect with their dead ancestors.

Reception for Other Worlds was mostly positive. A reviewer for the Journal of the Royal Anthropological Institute praised the book as being "a valuable contribution to the ethnography of east Nepal". Gregory Maskarinec of Anthropos commented that Other Worlds "must have lacked a copy editor" due to the book's uneven feel and typographical errors.

Table of contents

References

Anthropology books
2000 non-fiction books